The Montgomery Ward Building (also known as the Old Montgomery Ward Building) is a historic department store building at 517-19 Main Street in Downtown Evansville, Indiana. It has three stories and was completed in 1933 in the Georgian Revival style.

See also
Montgomery Ward

References

National Register of Historic Places

Colonial Revival architecture in Indiana
Buildings and structures completed in 1933
Buildings and structures in Evansville, Indiana
Economy of Indiana
National Register of Historic Places in Evansville, Indiana
Department stores on the National Register of Historic Places
Montgomery Ward
Commercial buildings on the National Register of Historic Places in Indiana
1933 establishments in Indiana